Zhegër (in Albanian) or Žegra (in Serbian; Жегра) is a village in the Gjilan district of Kosovo. It is located in the Karadak region on the banks of the Žegra river, a right tributary of the Binačka Morava, at the foot of Kušljevica (614 m), on both sides of the road towards Donja Budriga.

Notable people 
 Agim Ramadani, KLA commander 
 Xherdan Shaqiri (born 1991) a Swiss professional footballer who plays for Major League Soccer club Chicago Fire FC and Switzerland.

Notes

References

External links
 Location

Villages in Gjilan